Adolfo Guzman (born November 25, 1995) is an American soccer player.

Career

College & Amateur
Guzman played three years of college soccer at William Jessup University between 2015 and 2017.

Professional
In January 2018, Guzman signed with USL side Las Vegas Lights FC ahead of their inaugural 2018 season. He was released by Las Vegas on May 21, 2018.

References

External links 
 

1993 births
Living people
American soccer players
William Jessup Warriors men's soccer players
Las Vegas Lights FC players
Association football midfielders
Soccer players from Las Vegas
USL Championship players